Cryptoporus is a genus of fungi in the family Polyporaceae. Originally described as a section of Polyporus by Charles Horton Peck in 1880, Cornelius Lott Shear made it a distinct genus in 1902. Cryptoporus contains two species, C. sinensis and the type C. volvatus, found in southeast Asia and North America, respectively. C. sinensis is morphologically indistinguishable from C. volvatus except for its smaller spores (7.5–10 by 4–5 μm compared to 10–12.5 by 5–6 μm.

References

Taxa described in 1880
Polyporaceae
Taxa named by Charles Horton Peck
Polyporales genera